The 2008 Haarlem Baseball Week was an international baseball competition held at the Pim Mulier Stadium in Haarlem, the Netherlands from July 4–13, 2008. It was the 24th edition of the tournament and featured teams from Chinese Taipei, Cuba, Japan, Netherlands, Netherlands Antilles (including Aruba) and United States.

In the end the team from the United States won for the thirteenth time the tournament.

Group stage

Standings

 Chinese Taipei is the official IBAF designation for the team representing the state officially referred to as the Republic of China, more commonly known as Taiwan. (See also political status of Taiwan for details.)
 The Netherlands Antilles (including Aruba) were represented by the Dutch Caribbean Team.

Game results

Final round

Semi finals

5th place

3rd place

Final

Final standings

Tournament awards

External links
Official Website

References

2008 in baseball